August Kraupar (14 April 1895 – 26 December 1968) was an Austrian footballer. He played in nine matches for the Austria national football team from 1915 to 1918.

References

External links
 

1895 births
1968 deaths
Austrian footballers
Austria international footballers
Place of birth missing
Association footballers not categorized by position